Parahydrogen-induced polarization (PHIP) is a technique used in magnetic resonance imaging.

The technique relies on the incorporation of hyperpolarized H2 into molecules, usually by hydrogenation.

References

Scientific techniques